William Irving Dodge (c. 1789 Johnstown, then in Montgomery Co., now in Fulton County, New York – January 1873) was an American politician from New York.

Biography

He was the son of Maj. Gen. Richard Dodge (1762–1832) and Ann Sarah (Irving) Dodge (1770–1808), a sister of Washington Irving (1783–1859). On January 23, 1812, he married Patience Akin (1793–1879), and they had five children. He fought in the War of 1812 as a captain, and took part in the Battle of Plattsburgh in September 1814.

Career

He was a presidential elector in 1820, voting for James Monroe and Daniel D. Tompkins. He was District Attorney of Montgomery County from 1821 to 1830. In 1824, he ran for Congress in the 16th District, but was defeated by Henry Markell. He was a member of the New York State Senate (4th D.) from 1831 to 1834, sitting in the 54th, 55th, 56th and 57th New York State Legislatures. Afterwards he removed to Syracuse, New York, and resumed the practice of law there.

Col. Richard Irving Dodge was his nephew.

References

The New York Civil List compiled by Franklin Benjamin Hough (pages 128ff, 140, 326 and 376; Weed, Parsons and Co., 1858)

1780s births
1873 deaths
People from Johnstown, New York
Politicians from Syracuse, New York
New York (state) state senators
New York (state) Jacksonians
19th-century American politicians
County district attorneys in New York (state)
1820 United States presidential electors
New York (state) Democratic-Republicans
Military personnel from Syracuse, New York